Muzhichye is a rural locality (a selo) in Beryozovskoye Rural Settlement, Vorobyovsky District, Voronezh Oblast, Russia. The population was 909 as of 2010. There are 7 streets.

Geography 
Muzhichye is located 16 km northeast of Vorobyovka (the district's administrative centre) by road. Beryozovka is the nearest rural locality.

References 

Rural localities in Vorobyovsky District